Claire Adams (1898–1978) was a Canadian actress.

Claire Adams may also refer to:

Claire Adams (British actress), see List of EastEnders characters (2007)
Claire Adams, musician in Gravenhurst (band)
Claire Adams, character in Women in the Night